Ithnaini binti Mohamed Taib (born 23 March 1952), better known by her stage name Anita Sarawak, is a Singaporean singer, actress and talk show host.

Early years
Anita is the only child of actor and director S. Roomai Noor and actress Siput Sarawak. Her parents separated when she was 9 months old and Anita lived with her father. When Anita was around 12 years old, she went to live with her mother Siput and started preparation for her acting career.

Career
At 14, Anita acted in her first film, Dua Kali Lima.

At 15, Anita started performing at weddings and other functions. Anita first came to prominence at the age of 17, when she released her debut album With A Lot O’ Soul. In 1974, she released her first Malay album.

Throughout the 1970s, Anita actively promoted Singapore as a tourist destination through her performances. In 1974, she performed for a week in Hawaii; in 1975, she performed for nine days in West Germany; in 1976 in Monte Carlo for two weeks.

In 1979, she launched a three-month performing tour of the United States, including shows in New York, San Francisco and Chicago.

In 1985, she took off for Las Vegas and spent 18 years there performing at Caesars Palace.

Anita has also hosted The Anita Talkshow and Astana and acted in the telecomedy Agensi Melor and the telemove Topeng (Mask). She also released a cookbook, Cooking with Love, in 2004.

Personal life
Anita has been married four times. She is currently married to Briton Mohamad Mahathir Abdullah (formerly Martin Cox), who is her manager. The couple first met in Las Vegas, and wed in 2001.

In December 1972, Anita married Mohamed Abdul Samad. The couple divorced in August 1979.

In October 1981, Anita married the Indonesian singer Broery Pesulima. Anita's father objected to the marriage as Broery is Christian while Anita is a Muslim. Broery converted to Islam during their marriage but he couple later separated. Broery would later renounce Islam and converted back to Christianity.

In 1995, Anita was caught for close proximity (khalwat) with her third husband J. D. Nicholson, who she was engaged to at the time. Anita attended a hearing in court and paid a fine.

In September 2009, Anita's husband Mohamad Mahathir Abdullah was attacked outside her stepmother Datin Umi Kalthum's home in Taman Melawati, Malaysia. Anita subsequently forgave the robbers.

In February 2011, Anita collected the Legend Award for her mother, Siput, at the Seri Temasek Awards. Anita said, "It was the proudest day of my life, an exceptional and emotional moment."

In July 2013, Anita's stepmother Datin Umi Kalthum, a veteran Malaysian actress, died. Anita, who lives in the United States, could not return for the funeral.

Discography

EP

Album

Filmography

Film

Host TV

Television series

Television movie

References

1952 births
Living people
20th-century Singaporean women singers
Singaporean people of Malay descent
21st-century Singaporean women singers